Little Wheeling Creek is a  long 4th order tributary to Wheeling Creek in Ohio County, West Virginia.

Variant names 
According to the Geographic Names Information System, it has also been known historically as:
 Middle Wheeling Creek

Course 
Little Wheeling Creek rises about 0.25 miles northwest of West Alexander, Pennsylvania, in Washington County and then flows southwest into Ohio County, West Virginia to Wheeling Creek at Wheeling.

Watershed 
Little Wheeling Creek drains  of area, receives about 41.0 in/year of precipitation, has a wetness index of 293.17, and is about 63% forested.

See also 
 List of rivers of Pennsylvania
 List of rivers of West Virginia

References 

Rivers of Washington County, Pennsylvania
Rivers of Ohio County, West Virginia
Rivers of Pennsylvania
Rivers of West Virginia